, literally "Too Noisy!", is the sixth single by the Japanese girl idol group HKT48. It features the Japanese rock band Kishidan. The single was released in Japan on November 25, 2015, on the label Universal Sigma.

The CD single sold roughly 281,000 copies in its first week and debuted at number one on the Oricon weekly singles chart.

In order to prevent leaks and piracy, the label decided not to premiere the full version of their music video in M-On until release date, due to being released in a same date of "Cup no Naka no Komorebi", debut single from SKE48 sub-unit Love Crescendo. The full version of this MV was not published along with the release of 74 Okubun no 1 no Kimi e, and its release on YouTube may be delayed a few days due to Kishidan belong to Avex Trax.

"Shekarashika!" was the last single released while HKT48 Theater was located in Hawks Town Mall, as it was closed on 31 March 2016. A new theater will open in Nishitetsu Hall.

Composition 
Mainichi Shimbun described the title song as an impressive groovy rock tune whose lyrics express the feeling of true love.

Details 
The title track is the theme song of the Nippon TV dorama .

The center position in (the choreography for the) title song is held by Haruka Kodama It was her first solo center position since HKT48's fourth single "Hikaeme I Love You!", because in the fifth single "12 Byō" she shared the center position with Sakura Miyawaki.

Track listing

Type A

Type B

Type C

Theater Edition

Personnel

"Shekarashika!" 
HKT48 members who participate on the title track are: Chihiro Anai, Manaka Tada, Yui Kojina, Haruka Kodama, Riko Sakaguchi (her first appearance in a senbatsu), Rino Sashihara, Meru Tashima, Miku Tanaka, Mio Tomonaga, Mai Fuchigami, Natsumi Matsuoka, Sakura Miyawaki, Aoi Motomura, Madoka Moriyasu, Kanako Yabuki, Emily Yamashita (her first appearance in a senbatsu).

"Tasogari no Tandem"

"Buddy"

"Yumemiru Team KIV"

Charts

Year-end charts

References

External links 
 Profile on the HKT48 official website
 Music videos on YouTube
 "Shekarashika!" (short version)
 "Buddy" (short version)
 "Yumemiru Team KIV" (short version)
 "Ijiwaru Chū" (short version)

2015 singles
Japanese-language songs
HKT48 songs
Oricon Weekly number-one singles
2015 songs